Polibio Fumagalli (26 October 1830 in Inzago – 21 June 1900 in Milan) was an Italian composer, organist, and pianist.

Fumagalli studied organ at the Milan Conservatory; beginning in 1873 he taught organ at that institution.  Among his students were Marco Enrico Bossi and Pietro Yon.  He also served as choirmaster of the Church of San Celso.

Much of Fumagalli's compositional output was for his own instrument, he had over 300 pieces published.  His work La Caccia was taken up by the English organist William Thomas Best as a frequent concert piece.

Fumagalli's brothers Carlo, Disma, Adolfo, and Luca were all composers as well.

References
Sources
 Francesco Bussi: Polibio Fumagalli. In: The New Grove Volume 7, p. 29.
 Barbara Stühlmeyer: Polibio Fumagalli. Erneuerer von Ton und Taste: In: Die Tagespost, 19. Juli 2017.
 Alfred Baumgartner: Propyläen Welt der Musik, Band 2, p. 360
 The Aeolian Company : The Aeolian Pipe-Organ and Its Music'', Wildhern Press, 2008. p. 131

Citations

1830 births
1900 deaths
19th-century Italian composers
19th-century classical pianists
19th-century Italian male musicians
Italian male composers
Italian classical organists
Italian classical pianists
Italian male pianists
Male classical pianists
Male classical organists
Milan Conservatory alumni
Academic staff of Milan Conservatory
People from the Province of Milan
19th-century organists